Nicolas Hartmann (born 3 March 1985 in Altkirch) is a French professional road bicycle racer who is currently riding for Bretagne-Schuller.

Palmares 

 Tour de l'Avenir - 1 stage (2007)
 Route du Sud - 9th (2007)
 Tour des Pays de Savoie - 1 stage (2006)

External links 

French male cyclists
1985 births
Living people
People from Altkirch
Sportspeople from Haut-Rhin
Cyclists from Grand Est